Yrjö Henrik Kesti (28 June 1885 – 9 October 1960) was a Finnish farmer and politician, born in Oulu. He was a Member of the Parliament of Finland from 1930 to 1936, representing the Small Farmers' Party of Finland.

References

1885 births
1960 deaths
People from Oulu
People from Oulu Province (Grand Duchy of Finland)
Small Farmers' Party of Finland politicians
Members of the Parliament of Finland (1930–33)
Members of the Parliament of Finland (1933–36)